Don Brown is a Canadian voice actor and comedian. An expert in comedic and villainous roles, Don is best known as the voice of Jaken and Tōga from the critically acclaimed Inuyasha series, Siegel Clyne from Gundam SEED, Balgus from the original Escaflowne dub and Chief Otsuka from Tetsujin 28th.

Voice roles

References

External links
 
 
 
 
 
 Tony Valdez at CrystalAcids
 

Living people
20th-century Canadian male actors
21st-century Canadian male actors
Canadian male film actors
Canadian male television actors
Place of birth missing (living people)
Year of birth missing (living people)
Canadian male voice actors
Canadian impressionists (entertainers)